The 4-Piece (四枚落ち yonmai-ochi) handicap in shogi has both of White's major pieces, the rook (飛) and the bishop (角), removed as well as their lances (香). Thus, White is left with pawns, golds, silvers, and knights.

Black has the usual setup of twenty pieces.

The 4-Piece handicap is an official handicap of the Japan Shogi Association.

Openings

Climbing Silver

Climbing Gold

See also 

 Handicap (shogi)
 Shogi opening

References

Bibliography

 
  · irregular game from 1756
  · 4-Piece handicap games from 1981
  · Rook & Lance, 2-Piece, 4-Piece, and 6-Piece  handicap games from 1981
  · Rook and 4-Piece handicap games from 1981 with commentary by Larry Kaufman

External links
 Handicap Series by Larry Kaufman:
 Four piece part 1: Climbing gold or silver 
 Four piece part 2: Alternatives
 YouTube: How To Play Shogi (将棋): Lesson 25: Handicapped Games (1/2) by HIDETCHI from 9:02

Shogi openings
Handicap shogi openings